Lady Raffles is a 1928 American silent comedy crime film directed by Roy William Neill and starring Estelle Taylor, Roland Drew and Lilyan Tashman.

Cast
 Estelle Taylor as Lady Raffles  
 Roland Drew as Warren Blake  
 Lilyan Tashman as Lillian  
 Ernest Hilliard as Dick 
 Winifred Landis as Mrs. Blake

References

Bibliography
 Monaco, James. The Encyclopedia of Film. Perigee Books, 1991.

External links

1928 films
1920s crime comedy films
American crime comedy films
Films directed by Roy William Neill
American black-and-white films
Columbia Pictures films
American silent feature films
1928 comedy films
1920s English-language films
1920s American films
Silent American comedy films
Silent crime comedy films
English-language crime comedy films